CBS Summer Playhouse is an American anthology series that ran from June 12, 1987 to August 22, 1989 on CBS. It aired unsold television pilots during the summer season.

Overview
Tim Reid and Daphne Maxwell Reid acted as hosts during the first season, introducing each pilot. Viewers were also encouraged to call a 1-800 number at the end of each episode, to voice their preference. However, the "winning" pilot chosen by the viewers was never picked up as a series.

The series was revamped during the second and third seasons, and featured no hosts or viewer voting.

Reception
David Bianculli of The Philadelphia Inquirer criticized the anthology series, writing that it "may be the most inaccurate title ever given to a TV program". Bianculli cited two aspects, that the show premiered just before summer began in 1987 and that none of the episodes originated from theatrical playhouses.

Episodes

Season 1 (1987)

Season 2 (1988)

Season 3 (1989)

References

External links

1987 American television series debuts
1989 American television series endings
1980s American anthology television series
Summer Playhouse
Interactive television
Television pilots not picked up as a series
English-language television shows